The Spieden Formation is a geologic formation in the US state of Washington. It preserves fossils dating back to the Cretaceous period.

See also

 List of fossiliferous stratigraphic units in Washington (state)
 Paleontology in Washington (state)

References
  PaleoDB collection 83571

Cretaceous geology of Washington (state)